National Highway 709 (NH 709 Ext) starts from Rajgarh and ends at Panipat, Rajgarh is in the state of Rajasthan. Rohtak, Bhiwani and Pilani are the major towns in between on this highway route. This highways meets with National Highway 1(Delhi to Amritsar) at Panipat Bypass. Four Lanning between Kalanaur and Bhiwani has completed. Toll Gates are being Constructed near Bhiwani.

Route
The route of National Highway 709 passes through the following towns and villages:-

Rajgarh
Pilani
Loharu
Bhiwani
Kalanaur
Lahli
Rohtak
Bahmanwas
Jassia
Ghilaur
Rukhi
Bhainswan Khurd

Mahra
Gohana
Mundlana
Chirana
Israna
Naultha
Dohar
Mehrana
Panipat

See also
List of National Highways in India (by Highway Number)
List of National Highways in India
National Highways Development Project

References

External links
NH 709 on OpenStreetMap

National highways in India
National Highways in Haryana
Transport in Panipat